ARA Luisito (Q-51) is a training ship of the Argentine Navy, in service since 1985 and based in Mar del Plata; where she is used to train students from Argentina’s National Fishing School. The vessel is the first Argentine naval ship with this name.

Design 

Luisito is a fishing trawler built in Japan. She has a single mast on top of the superstructure, and a crane on her stern to haul the fishing net. 

The ship can only use the Trawling fishing method.

History 

Luisito was donated by Japan in 1983 to the National Fishing School (Spanish: Escuela Nacional de Pesca) "Comandante Luis Piedrabuena", which depends from the Argentine Navy. The donation was part of a Technological Cooperation Agreement between the governments of Argentina and Japan, to be used in applying the theoretical concepts learned in class.

In 2008 it was intended to overhaul her, however the required budget was not allocated.

See also 
 List of active Argentine Navy ships
 List of auxiliary ships of the Argentine Navy

References

Notes

Bibliography

Other sources

Further reading

External links
 Escuela Nacional de Pesca – Galería 
 De Pecio a Cuter: el Luisito 
 Master Thesis on formation of Fishing Pilots, by M. A. Portela, September 2012 

Training ships of the Argentine Navy
Ships built in Japan
1983 ships